Gachetá is a municipality and town of Colombia, capital of the Guavio Province, part of the department of Cundinamarca. The municipality borders Machetá and Manta in the north, the department of Boyacá and Ubalá in the east, Gama and Junín in the south and Guatavita in the west.

Etymology 
The name Gachetá comes from Muysccubun and means "behind our farmfields".

History 
Gachetá before the Spanish conquest was inhabited by the Muisca, organised in their loose Muisca Confederation. Gachetá was part of the domains of the cacique of Guatavita.

Modern Gachetá was founded on April 2, 1593, by Miguel de Ibarra.

Economy 
Main economical activity of Gachetá is agriculture, with main products coffee, maize, yuca, arracacha, potatoes, beans, sugarcane and blackberries cultivated.

Gallery

References 

Municipalities of Cundinamarca Department
Populated places established in 1593
1593 establishments in the Spanish Empire
Muisca Confederation
Muysccubun